Ulrike M. Malmendier (born 1973) is a German economist who is currently a professor of economics and finance at the University of California, Berkeley. Her work focuses on behavioral economics, corporate finance, and law and economics. In 2013, she was awarded the Fischer Black Prize by the American Finance Association.

IDEAS lists her as among the top 5% most cited economists and as among the top 100 young economists who started publishing 15 years ago. Her work on behavioral biases in financial markets has been featured in publications including The Economist, Investors Chronicle, The Wall Street Journal, the New York Times, Barron's, The Boston Globe, Bloomberg, and The New Yorker. She has been profiled in The American Magazine and The Chronicle of Higher Education.

Education

Career

Malmendier was born in 1973 in Cologne, then in West Germany. After high school, Malmendier trained as a bank clerk, then studied Economics on a Studienstiftung scholarship. She earned a Ph.D. in law from the University of Bonn in 2000 and a Ph.D. in business economics from Harvard Business School in 2002; her Harvard doctoral thesis was Behavioral approaches to contract theory and corporate finance. Andrei Shleifer served as Malmendier's adviser at Harvard. She worked as an assistant professor of finance at Stanford University from 2002 to 2006. During that time she held visiting positions at the University of Chicago and Princeton University. Malmendier moved to Berkeley in 2006 where she earned tenure in 2008. She currently is a research associate at the National Bureau of Economic Research, research affiliate at the Centre for Economic Policy Research, and faculty research fellow at the Institute for the Study of Labor.

She was named Alfred P. Sloan Research Fellow (2010-2012), and she received several Citations of Excellence by Emerald for her research (2009, 2006). 

In August 2022 Malmendier was appointed by the German government for a five-year term as one of the five economic experts (known as the Five Sages) who make up the German Council of Economic Experts. In October 2022 she was a member of a panel which met in Berlin to discuss the reconstruction of Ukraine.

Work

Malmendier's work focuses on behavioral economics, corporate finance, and law and economics. She has conducted extensive research on CEO overconfidence where she found that overconfident CEOs invested too much money in their companies and pursued destructive acquisitions more frequently than other managers.

She has explored how behavioral biases affect financial decision-making in other contexts. Malmendier has found that people who lived through the Great Depression remain more frugal throughout their lives, a majority of people overestimate how often they will visit the gym, and that security analysts distort recommendations for profit.

Malmendier has also done research into the origin of shareholder companies. She has examined an early form of shareholder company in ancient Rome called the societas publicanorum.

Honors and awards
In 2013, she won the prestigious Fischer Black Prize, presented biennially by the American Finance Association  for significant original research in finance. In 2019 she was awarded the Gustav Stolper Prize by the German Verein für Socialpolitik. In 2021 she was named a Fellow of the Econometric Society.

Personal life

Malmendier is married to fellow Berkeley economics professor Stefano DellaVigna.

References

External links
 Ulrike Malmendier's home page at the University of California Berkeley
 Ulrike's Malmendier's CV

21st-century American economists
American women economists
Haas School of Business faculty
1973 births
Living people
Harvard Business School alumni
University of Bonn alumni
Fellows of the American Academy of Arts and Sciences
Fellows of the Econometric Society
German emigrants to the United States
German women economists
Writers from Cologne
Stanford University Graduate School of Business faculty
21st-century American women